John Lamont is a Scottish politician.

John Lamont may also refer to:

John Lamont (sugar planter) (1782–1850), Scottish emigrant and Trinidad plantation owner
John Lamont (astronomer) (1805–1879), Scottish-German astronomer 
John Henderson Lamont (1865–1936), Canadian judge
John Salmon Lamont (1885–1964), Canadian politician
John Lamont (priest) (fl. 1814), Scottish priest from Aberchalder

John Lamont, Caithness (2007-)